Bishop's Meadow is a 21.8 hectare Local Nature Reserve on the northern outskirts of Loughborough in Leicestershire. It is owned and managed by Charnwood Borough Council.

This area of grassland, swamp and fen has mature beech trees, a diverse flora, fungi and bryophytes. The Grand Union Canal runs along its southern boundary.

There is access by a footbridge from the canal towpath.

References

Local Nature Reserves in Leicestershire
Loughborough